| tries = {{#expr:
 11 + 6 + 5 + 3 + 5 + 7 + 4 + 11 + 6 + 7        
 + 10 + 2 + 3 + 12 + 2 + 6 + 5 + 3 + 10 + 2
 + 5 + 7 + 7 + 2 + 11 + 6 + 5 + 7 + 10 + 11
 + 5 + 2 + 4 + 7 + 5 + 1 + 4 + 3 + 9 + 4
 + 8 + 11 + 6 + 6 + 6 + 11 + 7 + 7 + 10 + 5
 + 8 + 8 + 6 + 8 + 5 + 3 + 9 + 2 + 10 + 5
 
 
 
}}
| top point scorer =  Jamie Shillcock (Worcester Warriors)67 points
| top try scorer =  Jamie Shillcock (Worcester Warriors)5 tries
| venue               = Stade Maurice David
| attendance2         = 
| champions           =  Bristol Bears
| count               = 1
| runner-up           =  Toulon
| website             = EPCR Website
| previous year       = 2018–19
| previous tournament = 2018–19 European Rugby Challenge Cup
| next year           = 2020–21
| next tournament     = 2020–21 European Rugby Challenge Cup
}}

The 2019–20 European Rugby Challenge Cup was the sixth edition of the European Rugby Challenge Cup, an annual second-tier rugby union competition for professional clubs. Including the predecessor competition, the original European Challenge Cup, this was the 24th edition of European club rugby's second-tier competition. Clubs from six European nations competed, including Russian and Italian clubs who qualified via the Continental Shield.

The tournament began in November 2019. The final took place on 16 October at the Stade Maurice David in Aix-en-Provence.

Teams
20 teams will qualify for the 2019–20 European Challenge Cup; 18 will qualify from Premiership Rugby, the Pro14 and the Top 14, as a direct result of their domestic league performance, with two qualifying through the 2018–19 Continental Shield. The distribution of teams is:
 England: Five teams
 Any teams finishing between 7th and 11th position in Premiership Rugby that do not qualify for the Champions Cup (Sale Sharks (7th) qualified for the Champions Cup and therefore did not take part in the Challenge Cup)).
 The champion of the RFU Championship.
 France: Eight teams
 Any teams finishing between 7th and 12th position in the Top 14 that do not qualify for the 2019-20 European Champions Cup
 The champion from the Pro D2.
 The winner of the promotion-relegation play-off between the team in 13th position in the Top 14 and the runner-up of the Pro D2.
 Italy, Scotland, Wales: six teams
 Five teams from the Pro14, excluding the South African teams, that do not qualify for the 2019-20 European Champions Cup
 One team from Italy qualified through the Continental Shield
 Russia: one team
 One team from Russia qualified through the Continental Shield

No team from Ireland will participate in the competition as all four clubs have qualified for the 2019-20 European Champions Cup.

The following clubs have qualified for the Challenge Cup.

Qualifying competition

Six teams were split into two pools of three to compete in the pool stage of the European Rugby Continental Shield. Each team played the other two teams in its pool twice on a home-and-away basis. The winner of each pool faced each other in a two-legged play-off for a place in the Challenge Cup.

A further place was awarded to the winner of a two-legged playoff between the two sides competing in the 2018–19 Challenge Cup.

Qualifying play-offs

Team details
Below is the list of coaches, captain and stadiums with their method of qualification for each team.

Note: Placing shown in brackets, denotes standing at the end of the regular season for their respective leagues, with their end of season positioning shown through CH for Champions, RU for Runner-up, SF for losing Semi-finalist and QF for losing Quarter-finalist.

Seeding
The 20 competing teams will be seeded and split into four tiers; seeding is based on performance in their respective domestic leagues. Where promotion and relegation is in effect in a league, the promoted team is seeded last, or (if multiple teams are promoted) by performance in the lower competition.

Based on these seedings, teams are placed into one of the four tiers, with the top-seeded clubs being put in Tier 1. The nature of the tier system means that a draw is needed to allocate two of the three second-seed clubs to Tier 1. The fourth-seed team from the same domestic league as the second-seed team which was put in Tier 2 will also be placed in Tier 2. Brackets show each team's seeding and their league. e.g. 1 Top 14 indicates the team was the top seed from the Top 14.

Given the nature of the Continental Shield, a competition including developing rugby nations and Italian clubs not competing in the Pro14, the qualifying teams from this competition are automatically included in Tier 4.

Pool stage

The draw took place in June 2019.

Teams in the same pool will play each other twice, both at home and away in the group stage, that will begin in November 2019, and continue through to January 2020, before the pool winners and three best runners-up progressed to the quarter finals.

Teams will be awarded competition points, based on match result. Teams receive four points for a win, two points for a draw, one attacking bonus point for scoring four or more tries in a match and one defensive bonus point for losing a match by seven points or fewer.

In the event of a tie between two or more teams, the following tie-breakers will be used, as directed by EPCR:
 Where teams have played each other
 The club with the greater number of competition points from only matches involving tied teams.
 If equal, the club with the best aggregate points difference from those matches.
 If equal, the club that scored the most tries in those matches.
 Where teams remain tied and/or have not played each other in the competition (i.e. are from different pools)
 The club with the best aggregate points difference from the pool stage.
 If equal, the club that scored the most tries in the pool stage.
 If equal, the club with the fewest players suspended in the pool stage.
 If equal, the drawing of lots will determine a club's ranking.

Pool 1

Pool 2

Pool 3

Pool 4

Pool 5

Ranking of pool leaders and runners-up

Knock-out stage

Bracket

Quarter-finals

Semi-finals

Final

Attendances

Does not include the attendance at the final as it takes place at a neutral venue, or the attendances of matches played in empty stadiums due to the COVID-19 pandemic in Europe.

Player scoring
 Appearance figures also include coming on as substitutes (unused substitutes not included).

Most points

Most tries

Season records

Team
Largest home win – 56 points
66–10 Worcester Warriors at home to Enisei-STM on 11 January 2020
Largest away win – 70 points
73–3 Bordeaux Bègles away to Agen on 6 December 2019
Most points scored – 73 points
73–3 Bordeaux Bègles away to Agen on 6 December 2019
Most tries in a match – 11
Bordeaux Bègles away to Agen on 6 December 2019
Most conversions in a match – 9
Bordeaux Bègles away to Agen on 6 December 2019
Most penalties in a match – 6
Dragons at home to Worcester Warriors on 13 December 2019
Most drop goals in a match – 2
Leicester Tigers at home to Cardiff Blues on 12 January 2020

Player
Most points in a match – 27
 Jamie Shillcock for Worcester Warriors away to Enisey-STM on 15 November 2019
Most tries in a match – 4 (2)
 Jonah Holmes for Leicester Tigers at home to Pau on 16 November 2019
 Darcy Graham for Edinburgh at home to Agen on 18 January 2020
Most conversions in a match – 8 (2)
 Clovis Lebail for Pau at home to Calvisano on 22 November 2019
 Jamie Shillcock for Worcester Warriors at home to Enisei-STM on 11 January 2020
Most penalties in a match – 6
 Sam Davies for Dragons at home to Worcester Warriors on 13 December 2019
Most drop goals in a match – 2
 George Ford for Leicester Tigers at home to Cardiff Blues on 12 January 2020

Attendances
Highest – 17,553 
Bordeaux Bègles at home to Edinburgh on 11 January 2020
Lowest – 100
Enisei-STM at home to Castres on 6 December 2019
Highest average attendance — 15,620
Leicester Tigers
Lowest average attendance — 233
Enisei-STM

See also
2019–20 European Rugby Champions Cup

Notes

References

 
European Rugby Challenge Cup
European Rugby Challenge Cup
European Rugby Challenge Cup
European Rugby Challenge Cup
European Rugby Challenge Cup
European Rugby Challenge Cup
European Rugby Challenge Cup
EPCR Challenge Cup seasons